Live is a double live album by English art rock band Roxy Music, released in 2003. Their fourth official live album, it contains performances from a variety of venues on their 2001 reunion world tour, and represents the entire set list from those concerts. Live was packaged in a Digipak case.

Critical reception

On AllMusic Sean Westergaard wrote: "This set should impress those unfamiliar with Roxy and will surely thrill longtime fans. It's a fine testament to this band that these songs sound timeless rather than dated nearly 30 years down the line in many cases. After nearly two decades away, Roxy Music prove that they still have plenty of style and plenty of substance".

On bbc.co.uk, Nigel Bell stated: "Roxy's reunion might have been short lived (who knows?) but this is evidence that the band members can still compete with their younger upstarts".

Uncut magazine wrote the following: "Brian Eno's sniffy dismissal of his former colleagues' decision to regroup for this 2001 tour was soon retracted. No wonder—from the adrenalised rampage of the opening "Re-make/Re-model" to the dazed wonder of the final "For Your Pleasure", this two-CD features Roxy sounding as good if not better than ever. Eno or no Eno. The song choices are faultless, Ferry shimmers like a wounded apparition on "Every Dream Home", and elsewhere he's a riot of swooning romance and slick-backed menace. They still capture the giddy thrall of future pop perfection like no other outfit before or since. The strangely unadvertised original drummer, Paul Thompson, remains the devastating powerhouse helping them reach places beyond other bands' comprehension. Unfeasibly brilliant, dare they now chance a full-scale new album reunion? It would need to be very good not to sour these memories."

Track listing

Disc one

Disc two

Personnel
Roxy Music
Bryan Ferry - lead vocals, piano
Andy MacKay - saxophone, oboe, backing vocals
Phil Manzanera - lead guitar, additional backing vocals
Paul Thompson - drums
with:
Chris Spedding - guitar
Colin Good - piano, backing vocals, musical director
Zev Katz - bass
Lucy Wilkins - violin, keyboards, backing vocals
Julia Thornton - percussion, keyboards, backing vocals
Sarah Brown - backing vocals
Yanick Étienne - backing vocals
Michelle John - backing vocals
Sharon White - backing vocals

Production
Produced by Rhett Davies and Roxy Music.
Assistant Producer: Colin Good
Mixed by: Bob Clearmountain at Mix This!
Assistant: Kevin Harp
Mastered by: Bob Ludwig
Studio One Engineer: Michael Boddy
FOH Sound Engineer: Levi Tecofski
Monitor Engineer: Steve May & Tim Paterson (Europe)
Sound Technician: Mike Hackman
Recorded on: Mackie HDR
Designed by: Bogdan Zarkowski and Bryan Ferry.
Photography: Steve Jennings, Harris Montague, Colin Roy, Diana Scrimgeour, Fiona Volquardsen, Bogdan Zarkowski.
Sleeve Notes: Michael Bracewell
Album Co-ordination: Jim Lawn
Thanks to: John Giddings, Mick Green, Ronnie Harris, Robert Lee, Juliet Mann, Johnson Somerset, Katie Turner, Hohner.

References

2003 live albums
Roxy Music live albums
Albums produced by Rhett Davies